Vozdvizhenka is a rural locality (a village) in Gafurovsky Selsoviet, Tuymazinsky District, Bashkortostan, Russia. The population was 232 as of 2010. There are 4 streets.

Geography 
Vozdvizhenka is located 15 km southeast of Tuymazy (the district's administrative centre) by road. Kyzyl-Tash is the nearest rural locality.

References 

Rural localities in Tuymazinsky District